The France national under-17 football team is the national under-17 football team of France who will be playing in the UEFA European Championship this year or next year and is controlled by the French Football Federation. The team competes in the annual UEFA European Under-17 Championship and the FIFA U-17 World Cup, which is held every two years. The under-17 team also participates in local and international friendly tournaments, such as the Montaigu Tournament.

France have won the FIFA U-17 World Cup once in 2001 and also won the UEFA European Under-17 Championship three times in 2004, 2015 and 2022.

Current squad
 The following players were called up for the 2023 UEFA European Under-17 Championship qualification matches.
 Match dates: 25–31 October 2022
 Opposition: ,  and Caps and goals correct as of: 28 September 2022, after the match against 

 Previous squads 

FIFA U-17 World Cup/Championship squads
2015 FIFA U-17 World Cup squads – France
2011 FIFA U-17 World Cup squads – France
2007 FIFA U-17 World Cup squads – France
2001 FIFA U-17 World Championship squads – France
1987 FIFA U-16 World Championship squads – France

UEFA U-17 European Championships squads
2016_UEFA_European_Under-17_Championship squads – France
2015_UEFA_European_Under-17_Championship squads – France
2012 UEFA U-17 Football Championship squads – France
2011 UEFA U-17 Football Championship squads – France
2010 UEFA U-17 Football Championship squads – France
2009 UEFA U-17 Football Championship squads – France
2008 UEFA U-17 Football Championship squads – France
2007 UEFA U-17 Football Championship squads – France
2004 UEFA U-17 Football Championship squads – France
2002 UEFA U-17 Football Championship squads – France

Competitive record

FIFA U-17 World Cup record

UEFA U-17 European Championship record

*Draws include knockout matches decided by penalty shoot-out.
**Gold background colour indicates that the tournament was won. Red border colour indicates tournament was held on home soil.
***Red border colour indicates tournament was held on home soil.

Honours
 FIFA Under-17 World CupChampions (1): 2001
Third place (1): 2019

 UEFA European Under-17 ChampionshipChampions (3): 2004, 2015, 2022
Finalists (4): 1996, 2001, 2002, 2008

 Montaigu Tournament'Champions (9)'': 1976, 1977, 1983, 1996, 1997, 1998, 2001, 2005, 2006

References

External links
 Official site 

Under-17
European national under-17 association football teams
Youth football in France